Christ Agony is a Polish black metal band from Morąg, formed in 1990. Due to legal problems between 2005-2007 Christ Agony performed under the name Union.

Band members
Current members
Cezary "Cezar" Augustynowicz – guitar, vocals (1990–2003, 2005–2007, 2007-)

 Past members
Michał "Armagog" Samol - bass guitar (2017)
Tomasz "Reyash" Rejek – bass guitar, vocals (2000–2003, 2005–2007, 2007-)
Dariusz "Młody" Płaszewski – drums (2005–2006, 2012-) 
Marek "G-Hatt" Banaszewski – guitar (2000-2001)
Andrzej "Ash" Get – bass guitar, vocals (1990–1995)
Maurycy "Mauser" Stefanowicz – bass guitar (1995–1997)
Jarosław "Blackie" Mielczarek – bass guitar, vocals (1997–2000)
Piotr "Mścisław" Bajus – bass guitar, vocals (2010)
Adam "Żurek" Żuromski – drums (1990–1995)
Maciej "Gilan" Liszewski – drums (1995–1998)
Krzysztof "Docent" Raczkowski – drums (session, 1998, 1999)
Przemysław "Thoarinus" Wojewoda – drums (1998–2000)
Bartek "Bart" Baranowski – drums (session, 1999)
Witold "Vitold" Domański – drums (2000)
Krzysztof "Zaala" Zalewski – drums (2000–2003, 2011) 
Alex von Poschinger – drums (2006–2007)
Łukasz "Icanraz" Sarnacki – drums (2007–2009)
Krzysztof "Vizun" Saran – drums (2009–2010)
Dariusz "Hellrizer" Zaborowski – drums (2008, 2010–2011)
Zbigniew "Inferno" Promiński – drums (session, 2011)
Paweł "Paul" Jaroszewicz – drums (2011-2012)

Discography 
Sacronocturn (1990, Demo)
Epitaph of Christ (1992, Demo, Carnage Records)
Unholyunion (1993, Baron Records)
Daemoonseth - Act II (1994, Adipocere Records)
Faithless (1995, Compilation, Baron Records)
Moonlight - Act III (1996, Croon Records, Cacophonous Records)
Darkside (1997, Hammerheart Records, Morbid Noizz Productions)
Trilogy (1998, Pagan Records)
Elysium (1999, Metal Mind Records)
Moonlight Act III / Darkside (2000, Compilation, Apocalypse Productions)
Unholyunion / Daemoonseth Act II (2000, Compilation, Pagan Records)
Live - Apocalypse (2002, Apocalypse Productions)
Christ Agony (2005, as Union, Agonia Records)
Demonology (EP, 2007, Razor Productions)
Condemnation (2008, Razor Productions)
UnholyDeaMoon (2010, Compilation, Faithless Production)
NocturN (2011, Mystic Production)

References

External links

 

Polish black metal musical groups
Musical groups established in 1990
Mystic Production artists
Polish musical trios